The 2017 Metro Atlantic Athletic Conference women's basketball tournament was held March 2–6 at the Times Union Center in Albany, New York. The winner received an automatic trip to the 2017 Women's NCAA tournament.

Seeds
Teams are seeded by conference record, with a ties broken by record between the tied teams followed by record against the regular-season champion, if necessary.

Schedule

Bracket

See also
 Metro Atlantic Athletic Conference
 MAAC women's basketball tournament
 2017 MAAC men's basketball tournament

References

External links
2017 MAAC Women's Basketball Championship

MAAC women's basketball tournament
Tournament
Basketball competitions in Albany, New York
MAAC women's basketball tournament
MAAC women's basketball tournament
Women's sports in New York (state)
College basketball tournaments in New York (state)